Time Trial is a 2017 British documentary film directed by Finlay Pretsell. The film focuses on the final season of David Millar's professional cycling career. The film covers events including the 2014 Tour de France, the 2014 Giro d'Italia and the 2014 Milan–San Remo.

References

External links

2017 documentary films
2017 films
Documentary films about cycling
2010s English-language films
British sports documentary films
2010s British films